George Marten may refer to:

 George Marten (priest) (1876–1966), Anglican priest
 George Marten (cricketer, born 1801) (1801–1876), English cricketer
 George Marten (cricketer, born 1840) (1840–1905), English cricketer